The Sumba roundleaf bat (Hipposideros sumbae) is a species of bat in the family Hipposideridae. It lives in Indonesia and East Timor. It is present on the islands of Sumba, Rote, Sumbawa, Flores, Semau, and Savu.

Taxonomy and etymology
It was initially described as a subspecies of the intermediate roundleaf bat (Hipposideros larvatus) in 1960 by Oei Hong Peng. Its species name "sumbae" is derived from Sumba Island where the holotype was found. As the genus Hipposideros is speciose, it is divided into closely related species groups— the Sumba roundleaf bat is in the larvatus species group.

Biology
It is nocturnal, roosting in sheltered places such as caves and houses during the day. It likely roosts in large colonies. It is insectivorous.

Conservation
It is currently evaluated as least concern by the IUCN. It is locally common and it tolerates human modification of the landscape, as evinced by it roosting in houses sometimes. It may be declining due to the mining of limestone from its caves.

References

Hipposideros
Bats of Oceania
Bats of Indonesia
Mammals of Timor
Near threatened animals
Near threatened biota of Oceania
Mammals described in 1960
Taxonomy articles created by Polbot